Farid Bellabès (born October 20, 1985 in Oran) is an Algerian footballer. He played as a defender for ES Mostaganem in the Algerian Ligue Professionnelle 2.

References

External links
 DZFoot Profile
 

1985 births
Living people
Algerian footballers
JS Kabylie players
Footballers from Oran
MC Oran players
Algerian Ligue Professionnelle 1 players
USM Alger players
Association football defenders
21st-century Algerian people